Schizocarpum is a genus of nine accepted species of flowering plants of the family Cucurbitaceae. It is native to Mexico and Central America.

Selected species  
The nine accepted species are:

References

External links 

Cucurbitoideae
Cucurbitaceae genera